Harvey Dent is the birth name of Two-Face, a fictional character.

Harvey Dent may also refer to:
 Harvey Dent (1989 film series character)
 "Harvey Dent" (Gotham episode)